Habronattus pyrrithrix is a species of jumping spider in the family Salticidae. It is found in the southwestern United States and western Mexico.

A key predator is the larger jumping spider Phidippus californicus.

The males have bold black stripes, but the females have uniform coloration. The stripes are not known to confer any advantage.

References

Further reading

External links
 

Salticidae
Spiders described in 1924